All Souls is a 1919 German silent film directed by Erik Lund.

Cast
 Esther Hagan
 Bruno Kastner
 Karl Platen
 Käthe Roeven
 Toni Tetzlaff
 Leopold von Ledebur

References

Bibliography

External links

1919 films
Films of the Weimar Republic
German silent feature films
Films directed by Erik Lund
German black-and-white films
1910s German films